Amir Ubaydalavovich Gasanov (born 12 April 1987) is a former Russian professional football player.

Club career
He made his Russian Football National League debut for FC Dynamo Makhachkala on 28 August 2004 in a game against FC Oryol. That was his only season in the FNL.

External links
 

1987 births
Footballers from Makhachkala
Living people
Russian footballers
Association football defenders
FC Anzhi Makhachkala players
FC Dynamo Makhachkala players